The Whitehorse Waterfront Trolley was a heritage streetcar service in Whitehorse, Yukon, Canada.

The line used a single reconditioned trolley which carried tourists along Whitehorse's waterfront along the Yukon River.  It ran from the Rotary Peace Park, located on the south end of the city centre, up to the Roundhouse.

The trolley was first put into operation in 2000. The electricity to power its electric motors comes not from overhead trolley wires, but instead from a diesel generator. The car ran each year from July to September.

Car 531 details

The car originally served the trolley/streetcar system of Lisbon, Portugal, from 1925 to 1978. In 1978 it was sold by CCFL to a railway museum in Duluth. In 1999 it was sold to Whitehorse and restored by Historic Railway Restoration of Arlington, WA.

The trolley is a  narrow gauge vehicle, and ran on the track built for the White Pass and Yukon Route. It has a capacity of 24 passengers. This single-truck (4-wheels on 2-axles), double-ended trolley car was previously owned by Lake Superior Railroad Museum, which still owns sister car 530, and both cars were originally used by Companhia de Carris de Ferro de Lisboa (Carris) in Lisbon, Portugal.

Stations

 Spook Creek (Not in use in 2018)
 Jarvis Street (Not in use in 2018)
 Library and Cultural Centre (Request only) (Not in use in 2018)
 Trolley Roundhouse 
 White Pass
 Visitor Information Centre
 Rotary Park

Until 2018, it ran daily from noon until four o'clock. A complete trip, viewing all stations, took approximately 15 minutes. The car is stored in a roundhouse/train shed at 1127 First Avenue (end of Wood Street).

Cancellation of service

While repairs to the track aimed to have service resumed by mid-summer 2018, it was announced the trolley would not operate in the 2018 season.  In April 2018, the Yukon Government announced they would cease funding the trolley due to its financial burden. Shortly after, in June 2019, track infrastructure was still deteriorating and considered a hazard. One month later, near the end of July 2019, tracks in several areas were lifted.

See also 
 List of heritage railways in Canada
 Generator car

References

External links
 Whitehorse Waterfront Trolley
 Historic Railway Restoration – Yukon
 Page with photos at ExploreNorth. September 2000.

Heritage railways in Yukon
Heritage streetcar systems
Transport in Whitehorse
Streetcars in Canada
3 ft gauge railways in Canada
Railway services introduced in 2000
Railway services discontinued in 2018
Railway lines closed in 2019
J. G. Brill Company